René Hüssy  (born 29 August 1928 in Zürich, died 11 March 2007) was a Swiss football player and manager who played for Grasshopper Club Zürich and FC Lausanne-Sport and managed the Switzerland national football team.

Playing career
Hüssy began his professional playing career with Grasshopper Club Zürich in 1947 and won three Swiss titles and three Swiss cups during his time with Grasshoppers and Lausanne Sports.

Managerial career
Hüssy was the manager of FC Winterthur for eight years and Grasshopper Club Zürich for three years. He also coached the Switzerland national football team in 1970 and again from 1973 to 1976, FC Luzern and BSC Young Boys.

Honours
FIFA president Sepp Blatter presented Hüssy with the FIFA Order of Merit in recognition of his life's work on 28 May 2002.

References

1928 births
2007 deaths
Swiss men's footballers
Swiss football managers
Grasshopper Club Zürich players
FC Lausanne-Sport players
Switzerland national football team managers
BSC Young Boys managers
Grasshopper Club Zürich managers
FC Luzern managers
Footballers from Zürich
FC Winterthur managers
Association football defenders